In fluid dynamics, stagnation pressure is the static pressure at a stagnation point in a fluid flow. At a stagnation point the fluid velocity is zero. In an incompressible flow, stagnation pressure is equal to the sum of the free-stream static pressure and the free-stream dynamic pressure.

Stagnation pressure is sometimes referred to as pitot pressure because the two pressures are numerically equal.

Magnitude
The magnitude of stagnation pressure can be derived from Bernoulli equation for incompressible flow and no height changes. For any two points 1 and 2:

The two points of interest are 1) in the freestream flow at relative speed  where the pressure is called the "static" pressure, (for example well away from an airplane moving at speed ); and 2) at a "stagnation" point where the fluid is at rest with respect to the measuring apparatus (for example at the end of a pitot tube in an airplane). 

Then 

or

where:
 is the stagnation pressure
 is the fluid density
 is the speed of fluid
 is the static pressure

So the stagnation pressure is increased over the static pressure, by the amount  which is called the "dynamic" or "ram" pressure because it results from fluid motion.  In our airplane example, the stagnation pressure would be atmospheric pressure plus the dynamic pressure.

In compressible flow however, the fluid density is higher at the stagnation point than at the static point. Therefore,  can't be used for the dynamic pressure. For many purposes in compressible flow, the stagnation enthalpy or stagnation temperature plays a role similar to the stagnation pressure in incompressible flow.

Compressible flow
Stagnation pressure is the static pressure a gas retains when brought to rest isentropically from Mach number M.

or, assuming an isentropic process, the stagnation pressure can be calculated from the ratio of stagnation temperature to static temperature:

 

where:

 is the stagnation pressure
 is the static pressure
 is the stagnation temperature
 is the static temperature
 is the ratio of specific heats

The above derivation holds only for the case when the gas is assumed to be calorically perfect (specific heats and the ratio of the specific heats  are assumed to be constant with temperature).

See also 
Hydraulic ram
Stagnation temperature

Notes

References 
 L. J. Clancy (1975), Aerodynamics, Pitman Publishing Limited, London.  
 Cengel, Boles, "Thermodynamics, an engineering approach, McGraw Hill,

External links 
Pitot-Statics and the Standard Atmosphere
 F. L. Thompson (1937) The Measurement of Air Speed in Airplanes, NACA Technical note #616, from SpaceAge Control.

Fluid dynamics